The R511 road is a regional road in Ireland, located in central County Limerick.

References

Regional roads in the Republic of Ireland
Roads in County Limerick